eSobi is an integrated desktop-based information management tool and a standalone news aggregator delivered with worldwide Acer computers. eSobi is a shareware application and the full version of eSobi consists of four functions: (1) an RSS reader, (2) a podcast receiver, (3) a meta-search engine, and (4) a data library.

eSobi supports both 32-bit and 64-bit Windows 7 and Windows Vista, as well as Windows XP.

History
eSobi was first developed by esobi Inc. of Taipei, Taiwan in 2006 for Windows computers. It started out as the very first in the market to combine an RSS reader, a meta-search engine, and a scrapbook all in one application, aiming to ease information overload of the Web. Recent updates (September 2009) added a podcast receiver and features a new UI design.

Since 2008, Acer has bundled the simpler version of eSobi on its computers, including the popular netbook Acer Aspire One. This version of eSobi includes only the RSS reader and data library; both are free with the purchase of Acer computers. eSobi is also the software partner of Transcend Information, Inc. and the 90-day trial version is delivered with selected Transcend's JetFlash USB flash drives.

eSobi for Windows Mobile and Android platforms are also available.

Reviews
eSobi received a CNET Download.com 5-star editor’s review and a Softpedia 4-star “Very Good” editor’s review in 2009.

Features of eSobi for Windows PC
An RSS reader that handles feed subscriptions
News Watch for monitoring news of targeted topics set by keywords
Full-page, summary, and text-only reading modes
Offline readability
A podcast receiver with a download manager
A built-in Windows Media Player for quick play of audio and video files
A meta-search tool for retrieving results from multiple search engines simultaneously
A quick search tool for finding information by category (RSS feeds, blogs, travel, shopping, answers, etc.)
Automatic RSS feeds detection during browsing
Search History for storing entire search results including keywords and tabs
A data library where users can store, categorize, organize, edit and view web pages offline

See also
 List of feed aggregators

References

External links
eSobi official site
eSobi on Twitter

Atom (Web standard)
Windows Internet software
News aggregators